Lophostica is a genus of spiders in the family Salticidae (jumping spiders). Its three described species occur only on Mauritius and Réunion.

Species
, the World Spider Catalog accepted the following species:
 Lophostica mauriciana Simon, 1902 – Mauritius, Réunion
 Lophostica minor Ledoux, 2007 – Réunion
 Lophostica nova Ledoux, 2007 – Réunion

References

Salticidae
Salticidae genera
Spiders of Africa